Heterotheca mucronata is a species of flowering plant in the family Asteraceae. It is native to Mexico, where it has been found in Nuevo León, Tamaulipas, Coahuila, and northeastern Zacatecas.

References

External links
Photo of herbarium specimen collected in Nuevo León in 1993

mucronata
Flora of Northeastern Mexico
Plants described in 1984